Lee Hong-mi (born 25 January 1971) is a South Korean swimmer. She competed in three events at the 1988 Summer Olympics.

References

External links
 

1971 births
Living people
South Korean female butterfly swimmers
South Korean female freestyle swimmers
Olympic swimmers of South Korea
Swimmers at the 1988 Summer Olympics
Place of birth missing (living people)
Asian Games medalists in swimming
Asian Games bronze medalists for South Korea
Swimmers at the 1986 Asian Games
Medalists at the 1986 Asian Games
20th-century South Korean women